XHGEO-FM is a radio station on 91.5 FM in Guadalajara, Jalisco, Mexico. The station is owned by Grupo Promomedios and carries a news/talk format known as Zona Tres.

History
XHGEO received its first concession on January 16, 1970.

References

Radio stations in Guadalajara
Radio stations established in 1970